Jadab Chandra Deka is a Bharatiya Janata Party politician from Assam. He has been elected in Assam Legislative Assembly election in 2016 from Kamalpur.

References 

Living people
Bharatiya Janata Party politicians from Assam
Assam MLAs 2011–2016
Assam MLAs 2016–2021
People from Kamrup district
Year of birth missing (living people)